Neil Hague may refer to:

 Neil Hague (footballer) (born 1949), former footballer
 Neil Hague (rugby league) (born 1953), former rugby league footballer